Cronin is a surname.

Cronin may also refer to:

Cronin, Texas, unincorporated community in Anderson County

See also

Kronin, village in Elbląg County, Warmian-Masurian Voivodeship, Poland
Cronan (disambiguation)